Karishma Manandhar (born. Surya Kumari) is a Nepalese politician and an actress. She is considered as one of the most popular actresses in the history of Nepalese cinema. She is known for her roles, especially in romantic movies, and was also the most dominant actress of the 90s and 2000s era. She was born on February 30, 1972, according to her birth certificate.

She made her acting debut at the age of 16 in the 1988 Nepali film Santaan. Since then she spent more than three decades in the movie industry as a successful and leading actress, a superstar of Nepali cinemas, and has been able to make her own place in the hearts of the people. She has been successful to have a huge fan following and not only the former but also contemporary audiences like and appreciate her acting and beauty. She has starred in more than seventy movies; some of her biggest successes include Santan, Kasturi, Allare, Bhauju, Manakamana, Truk Driver, Sapana, Dhukdhuki, Basanti, Dhukdhuki, Jindagani, Papi Manchhe, etc. During her acting period, she was usually paired up with the legendary actor Rajesh Hamal and their on-screen chemistry was loved by the audiences of the time. Most of their movies together had been a huge commercial success and the pair had been considered as the Golden Couple of Nepali film industry.

She, however, left the movie industry and moved to the United States where she stayed for many years until she returned back to Nepal and opened up a shooting studio in Godavari. Besides acting in the movies, she has also been featured in some of the television commercials and the billboards around Nepal for the endorsement of Dabur Chyawanprash. She has also entered into the world of movie production with projects like Dhukdhuki and Babusaheb, while the latter was her only big success. 

She is married to Binod Manandhar and has a daughter. She also joined the political party Naya Shakti Nepal as a politician.

She is also active in politics. She recently joined CPN (UML). It is said that she joined politics as she was influenced by the political leader KP Sharma Oli.

Filmography

References 

https://www.lensnepal.com/profile/karishma-manandhar/filmography.html

External links 
 
 

Living people
Nepalese female models
21st-century Nepalese actresses
1974 births
People from Lalitpur District, Nepal
Nepalese women film producers